Nikita Georgevitch Shervashidze (1941–2008) was a Bulgarian politician. He served as the Minister of Energy in the 1990s.

Due to his descendancy from the historical ruling family of Abkhazia, he represented the interests of Abkhazia in Bulgaria during his later years. He was married to Lilyane Mileva of Bulgarian-Greek descendancy. They had a son Andrew.

See also
List of Princes of Abkhazia

References
 В Софии скончался полномочный представитель Абхазии в Болгарии 
 В Софии скончался представитель Абхазии в Болгарии Никита Георгиевич Шервашидзе-Чачба 
 

|-

|-

|-

1941 births
2008 deaths
Abkhazian nobility
Bulgarian people of Russian descent
Government ministers of Bulgaria
Nikita Georgevitch